Timișești is a commune in Neamț County, Western Moldavia, Romania. It is composed of five villages: Dumbrava, Plăieșu, Preutești, Timișești and Zvorănești.

References

Communes in Neamț County
Localities in Western Moldavia